The Monmouth Hawks men's soccer team is a varsity intercollegiate athletic team of Monmouth University in West Long Branch, New Jersey, United States. The team is a member of the Colonial Athletic Association, which is part of the National Collegiate Athletic Association's Division I. Monmouth's first men's soccer team was fielded in 1982. The team plays its home games at Hesse Field in West Long Branch, New Jersey. The Hawks are coached by Robert McCourt.

Seasons

Postseason

NCAA tournament results 

Monmouth has appeared in seven NCAA Tournaments. Their best performance was reaching the second round in 2009, 2011, and in 2020. Their most recent appearance was in 2020.

Individual achievements

All-Americans 

Monmouth has produced four All-Americans. The most recent All-American came in 2011.

Individual records

Career records

References

External links
 

 
1982 establishments in New Jersey
Soccer clubs in New Jersey